Jesse Thomas may refer to:

 Jesse Thomas (musician) (1911–1995), blues guitarist and singer from Louisiana
 Jesse Thomas (American football) (1928–2012), American pro football player in the NFL, AFL and CFL
 Jesse B. Thomas (1777–1853), U.S. politician
 Jesse Thomas (triathlete) (born 1980), American triathlete
 Jesse B. Thomas Jr. (1806–1850), Illinois politician

See also
Jessie O. Thomas (1885–1972), educator
Jess Thomas (1927–1993), American operatic tenor
Jessica Thomas (disambiguation)